The Junior Eurovision Song Contest 2019 was the seventeenth edition of the annual Junior Eurovision Song Contest, organised by Telewizja Polska (TVP) and the European Broadcasting Union (EBU). It was held on 24 November 2019, at the Gliwice Arena in Gliwice, Poland, following the country's victory at the  contest in Minsk, Belarus, with the song "Anyone I Want to Be", performed by Roksana Węgiel. It was the first time Poland had hosted the contest, as well as the first Eurovision event to be held in the country since the Eurovision Young Dancers 2013.

Nineteen countries participated in the contest, with  taking part for the first time since , while  and  did not return to the contest after having participated in 2018. Last year's winner Roksana Węgiel performed her entry again as the interval act, alongside the common song "Share the Joy" sung by all the participants and a dance performance by the host Ida Nowakowska.

Poland's Viki Gabor with the song "Superhero" was the winner of the contest, making Poland the first country to win the Junior Eurovision Song Contest two years in a row and the first country to win on home soil.  placed second, their best result that point. Returning country  placed third. The  and  completed the top five.  also earned their best result, 18th.

Location

The 2019 contest took place in Poland for the first time, following the country's victory at the 2018 edition with the song "Anyone I Want to Be", performed by Roksana Węgiel. It was the sixth time that the contest had been hosted by the previous year's winning country.

Venue 
The contest took place in Gliwice Arena, a sport and entertainment hall with a capacity of 17,178 in the main arena. It is considered one of the largest entertainment and sports halls in Poland.

Bidding phase and host city selection 

Prior to Poland's confirmation, two other countries had announced their intentions to host the event. These bids were from Armenia and Kazakhstan.

If the Kazakh proposal had been accepted, the Kazakh broadcaster Khabar Agency said they would have moved the contest to October due to possible adverse weather conditions in the Kazakh capital Nur-Sultan, which was proposed as the host city. Ιt would also have been the first time that an associate member was chosen to host an EBU flagship event. However, for this to happen, the general rules of the competition would have to be changed, because as in the adult competition, the competition cannot be held in a non-full member state of the EBU. For instance, this rule does not allow the competition to be held in Australia if the country wins, although they became an effective participant in 2016.

On 10 December 2018, it was confirmed by the EBU that Poland would host the 2019 contest. On 18 January 2019, in an interview for TVP Info, Director-General of the EBU Noel Curran stated that the contest would be held in Kraków. The same day, TVP issued a statement that the city had not yet been chosen. In February 2019, in the TVP1 news programme Wiadomości it was announced that the two cities remaining in the race are: Gliwice and Szczecin. On 6 March 2019, during a press conference held by TVP and the EBU, it was confirmed that the contest would be held in Gliwice with Silesian Voivodeship cooperation. This was the first time since the 2014 contest that the event is not hosted by a country's capital, as Warsaw does not have a suitable venue to host an event of this size.

Key:
 Host venue 
 Shortlisted

Format

Visual design

The theme for the contest, Share the Joy, was revealed on 13 May 2019 during a press conference prior to the Eurovision Song Contest 2019 in Tel Aviv, Israel. The press conference included Gert Kark (Project Manager), Konrad Smuga (Creative Director), Marta Piekarska (Project Coordinator) and Roksana Węgiel, the winner of the  contest.

Hosts
On 22 August 2019, it was announced that Ida Nowakowska, Aleksander Sikora and winner of the previous contest Roksana Węgiel would host the 2019 Junior Eurovision Song Contest. Węgiel is the first former winner to host an edition of the contest as well as the fifth person under the age of 16 to do so. Nowakowska is a Polish-American digital influencer and a multimedia person while Sikora is a Breakfast television host.

On 24 September 2019, journalists and TV hosts Agata Konarska and Mateusz Szymkowiak were confirmed as the hosts for the Opening Ceremony, which took place on 18 November in Silesian Theatre in Katowice, the capital city of the host region of Silesia. Konarska previously hosted the Eurovision Young Dancers 2005 in Warsaw.

Voting

The results was determined by national juries and an online audience vote. The first phase of the online voting started on 22 November at 20:00 CET when a recap of all the rehearsal performances were shown on the official website before the viewers could vote. This round of voting stopped on 24 November at 15:59 CET. The second phase of the online voting took place during the live show, which started at 16:00 CET, straight after the last performance and was open for 15 minutes. International viewers can vote for a minimum of three countries and a maximum of five, including their own country.
The number of points was determined by the percentage of votes received. The public vote counts for 50% of the final result, while the other 50% come from the professional juries.

Trophy
The trophy was designed by Kjell Engman of the Swedish glass company Kosta Boda, using the same design as was first introduced in the 2017 contest. The main trophy is a glass microphone with colored lines inside the upper part, which symbolize the flow of sound.

Postcards 
Each postcard took place in a different location in Poland. They all began with a short clip of the upcoming performer looking through a telescope at their postcard's location. A group of people performing an activity in said location was then shown. This activity was also included as a hashtag at the bottom of the screen. At completion of the activity, the upcoming performer is shown moving a digital kite (the logo of the contest) decorated with their country's flag, signalling the commencement of their performance.

 Market Square, Gliwice
 Victoria Theatre, Gliwice
 Queen Louise Adit Complex, Zabrze
 Żar
 , Gliwice
 Bielsko-Biała
 Neumann's Villa, Gliwice
 Silesian Opera, Bytom
 Żywiec Lake
 Silesian University of Technology, Gliwice
 , Koszęcin
 Paprocany Lake, Tychy
 Stadion Śląski, Chorzów
 Nikiszowiec
 Villa Caro, Gliwice
 Czantoria Wielka, Ustroń
 Pszczyna Castle, Pszczyna
 , Żory
 Ogrodzieniec Castle

Participating countries 
On 18 July 2019, the EBU released the official list of participants with 19 competing countries. Spain marked their first appearance since , while Azerbaijan and Israel did not return.

Detailed voting results

12 points
Below is a summary of all 12 points received from each country's professional juries.

Spokespersons 
The following people announced the jury 12 points for their respective country:

 Szymon
 Karolina
 Alisa Khilko and Khryusha
 Magdalena
 Violeta Leal
 Anastasia Garsevanishvili
 Emilia Niewinskaja
 Paula
 Cadi Morgan
 Aruzhan Khafiz
 Marianna Józefina Piątkowska
 Leo Kearney
 Darina Krasnovetska
 Anne Buhre
 Erik Antonyan
 Zofia
 Maria Iside Fiore
 Efi Gjika
 Bojana Radovanović

Online voting

Other countries 
For a country to be eligible for potential participation in the Junior Eurovision Song Contest, it needs to be an active member of the EBU. It is currently unknown whether the EBU issued invitations of participation to all 56 active members like they do for the Eurovision Song Contest.

Active EBU members
On 11 September 2018, Bulgarian National Television (BNT) announced that at the time being they were not planning a return to the 2019 contest. On 6 January 2019, BNT reiterated that they did not have plans to return to the contest in 2019 via their official Eurovision Twitter account. It was later revealed on 8 June 2019 that BNT had amassed massive debts, and were declared bankrupt. Bulgaria did not appear on the final list of participants published on 18 July 2019.
On 10 June 2019, it was revealed that Česká televize (ČT) had not made a full decision about participation, but were not expecting to be a participant, stating that their focus was on the Eurovision Song Contest 2020.
On 2 June 2019, Radio Televizija Crne Gore (RTCG) confirmed that they would not return to the contest in 2019 due to budget issues.
On 29 June 2019, BBC Alba confirmed that they would not debut in 2019 due to their participation in the Eurovision Choir that year, however they confirmed that talks had taken place that could enable participation in 2020.
According to Eurovision blog Eurofestivales, press spokesperson Erika Rusnáková for Slovak broadcaster Radio and Television of Slovakia (RTVS) stated that they were evaluating and supervising the possibility of debuting in the contest. However, on 10 June 2019, RTVS confirmed that they would not debut in the 2019 contest.
On 3 June 2019, Radiotelevizija Slovenija (RTV Slovenija) confirmed that they would not participate in the 2019 contest due to the cost of participation.

Broadcasts

Official album

Junior Eurovision Song Contest Gliwice 2019 is a compilation album put together by the European Broadcasting Union, and was released by Universal Music Group on 8 November 2019. The album features all the songs from the 2019 contest.

See also 
 Eurovision Choir 2019
 Eurovision Song Contest 2019

Notes

References

External links 

 
2019
2019 song contests
2019 in Poland
November 2019 events in Poland